This list has been split and items formerly under this title can be found at:

List of Commissioners' churches in Northeast and Northwest England
List of Commissioners' churches in Yorkshire